Guillermo Benítez is the name of:

Guillermo Benítez (footballer, born 1993), Argentine-born Paraguayan footballer
Guillermo Benítez (footballer, born 1999), Panamanian footballer